Marcian of Heraclea (Markianòs Hērakleṓtēs; ; fl.  century AD) was a  minor Greek geographer from Heraclea Pontica in Late Antiquity.

His known works are:

A Periplus of the Outer Sea. It mentions places from the Atlantic ocean to China.
An epitome of Menippus of Pergamon.
An epitome of Artemidorus Ephesius:    
Artemidorus and Menippus both likely wrote around the 1st century AD. Only little survives of the epitomes, through citations in the work of Stephanus of Byzantium, but in the case of Menippus there is also some manuscript material. From it, it seems Marcian had not improved much upon Menippus. Early in its publication history, the work of Pseudo-Scymnus had been attributed to Marcian. Apart from his writings, philologists believe that an annotated collection Marcian made of his sources in geography formed the basis of today's extant manuscripts of these earlier works.

References

Citations

Bibliography
 
 .
 . & 
 .
 .

4th-century writers
Byzantine geographers
4th-century geographers